Ashern Airport  is a registered aerodrome located  south of Ashern, Manitoba, Canada.

External links
Page about this airport on COPA's Places to Fly airport directory

References

Registered aerodromes in Manitoba